Eric Hicks may refer to:
Eric Hicks (American football) (born 1976), National Football League player
Eric Hicks (basketball) (born 1983), college basketball player